A. chinense may refer to:
 Allium chinense, the Chinese onion, Chinese scallion, Japanese scallion or Oriental onion, an edible species of wild onion found in Asia
 Alangium chinense, a flowering plant species

See also